Jordan Knackstedt (born September 28, 1988) is a Canadian professional ice hockey winger currently playing for Dresdner Eislöwen of the German DEL2.

Playing career
Knackstedt entered the major junior ranks with the Red Deer Rebels of the Western Hockey League (WHL) in 2004–05. Three seasons later, in his draft year, he was traded to the Moose Jaw Warriors and put up 56 points between the two teams. He was then drafted in the seventh round, 189th overall, by the Boston Bruins in the 2007 NHL Entry Draft. Returning to the Warriors, Knackstedt recorded a team-leading 85 points, seventh overall in league scoring. At the end of the WHL season, he was assigned by Boston to complete 2007–08 with the Providence Bruins of the American Hockey League (AHL).

On December 9, 2010, he was traded along with Jeff LoVecchio to the Florida Panthers in exchange for Sean Zimmerman and a conditional seventh round pick in the 2011 NHL Entry Draft.

Knackstedt signed a one-year contract with Bolzano-Bozen Foxes (HC Bolzano) as a free agent on 2011.

On September 25, 2013, the Bakersfield Condors of the ECHL signed Knackstedt for the 2013–14 season.

After a successful season with the Condors, Knackstedt opted to resume a European career in signing a one-year deal with Rubin Tyumen of the Russian second league the VHL, on August 6, 2014. He endured a journeyman 2014–15 season, transferring to fellow VHL club, Saryarka Karaganda before finishing the season in Germany with ESV Kaufbeuren of the DEL2.

On November 4, 2015, Knackstedt belatedly signed for the 2015–16 season, in returning to America to sign with the Greenville Swamp Rabbits of the ECHL.

Career statistics

Regular season and playoffs

International

References

External links

1988 births
Living people
Abbotsford Heat players
Bakersfield Condors (1998–2015) players
Bolzano HC players
Boston Bruins draft picks
Canadian ice hockey forwards
Dresdner Eislöwen players
EfB Ishockey players
ESV Kaufbeuren players
ETC Crimmitschau players
Greenville Swamp Rabbits players
HC Milano players
Herlev Hornets players
Ice hockey people from Saskatchewan
Moose Jaw Warriors players
Providence Bruins players
Quad City Mallards (ECHL) players
Red Deer Rebels players
Rochester Americans players
Rubin Tyumen players
Saryarka Karagandy players
Sportspeople from Saskatoon
Tingsryds AIF players
Canadian expatriate ice hockey players in Germany